The Tony Award for Best Direction of a Musical has been given since 1960.  Before 1960 there was only one award for both play direction and musical direction, then in 1960 the award was split into two categories: Dramatic and Musical.

Winners and nominees
†indicates the winner for the annual Tony Award for Best Musical

*indicates the winner for the annual Tony Award for Best Revival of a Musical

1950s

1960s

1970s

1980s

1990s

2000s

2010s

2020s

Award records

Multiple wins
8 Wins
 Harold Prince

3 Wins
 Gower Champion
 Tommy Tune

2 Wins
 George Abbott
 Michael Bennett
 Wilford Leach
 Des McAnuff
 Trevor Nunn
 Jerome Robbins

Multiple nominations

16 Nominations
 Harold Prince

8 Nominations
 Gower Champion

7 Nominations
 Scott Ellis

6 Nominations
 Bob Fosse
 James Lapine
 Trevor Nunn
 Tommy Tune

5 Nominations
 Michael Bennett
 Des McAnuff
 Casey Nicholaw
 Jerry Zaks

4 Nominations
 Michael Greif
 Richard Maltby Jr.
 Kathleen Marshall
 Michael Mayer
 Jack O'Brien
 Diane Paulus
 Bartlett Sher
 Susan Stroman
 George C. Wolfe

3 Nominations
 George Abbott
 Christopher Ashley
 Michael Blakemore
 John Doyle
 Michael Kidd
 Arthur Laurents
 Robert Moore
 Jerome Robbins
 Gene Saks
 Burt Shevelove

2 Nominations
 Michael Arden
 Vinnette Carroll
 Martin Charnin
 Rachel Chavkin
 Cy Feuer
 Nicholas Hytner
 Thomas Kail
 Joe Layton
 Wilford Leach
 Joshua Logan
 Mike Nichols
 Mike Ockrent
 Hector Orezzoli
 John Rando
 Claudio Segovia
 Julie Taymor
 Matthew Warchus
 Christopher Wheeldon

Female winners and nominees
Out of 22 women nominated for 34 musicals, only 5 women have won this award for 5 musicals:

Bold represents winner

See also
 Tony Award for Best Direction of a Play
 Drama Desk Award for Outstanding Director of a Musical
 Laurence Olivier Award for Best Director

References

External links
 Tony Awards Official site
 Tony Award for Direction of a Musical, Internet Broadway Database
 Tony Awards at broadwayworld.com

Tony Awards
Awards established in 1950
1950 establishments in the United States